Jethro Frederick Robinson (10 November 1914 – 22 May 2001) was an English cricketer. Robinson's batting style is unknown, though it is known he was a slow left-arm orthodox bowler. He was born at Eastbourne, Sussex, and educated at The King's School, Canterbury.

He made his first-class debut for Sussex against Cambridge University in 1935. He made a further first-class appearance for Sussex against Cambridge University in 1936, taking his career best figures of 5/47 in this match. He also studied at the University of Cambridge in 1936, making a single first-class appearance for the University in that same year against the touring Indians.

He died in Canada on 22 May 2001. His brother, Miles, also played first-class cricket.

References

External links
Jethro Robinson at ESPNcricinfo
Jethro Robinson at CricketArchive

1914 births
2001 deaths
Sportspeople from Eastbourne
People educated at The King's School, Canterbury
Alumni of the University of Cambridge
English cricketers
Sussex cricketers
Cambridge University cricketers